NGC 3607 is a small but fairly bright lenticular galaxy in the equatorial constellation of Leo, about 2.5° south of the prominent star Delta Leonis. The galaxy was discovered March 14, 1784 by William Herschel. Dreyer described it as "very bright, large, round, very much brighter middle, 2nd of 3". It is located at a distance of 73 million light years and is receding with a radial velocity of 930 km/s. It occupies the center of the Leo II Group of galaxies, forming one of its two brightest members – the other being NGC 3608. It is a member of the NGC 3607 Group of galaxies, which is a member of the Leo II Groups, a series of galaxies and galaxy clusters strung out from the right edge of the Virgo Supercluster.

The morphological class of NGC 3607 is SA(s)0*, matching a lenticular galaxy (SA0) with no inner ring structure (s). It is an intermediate mass galaxy that is being viewed at an inclination of 34°, showing an ellipticity of 0.13 with the major axis oriented along a position angle of 125°. The galaxy has an outer dusty disk with a second perpendicular disk that is falling inward toward the center of the galaxy. X-ray emission from hot gas has been detected in the interior and from all around the galaxy.

Orbital motions of this cluster system imply an unusual poverty of dark matter: perhaps  of the total mass within 5 effective radii. Its central black hole has a mass of M• =  The core region of the galaxy is kinematically distinct from the remainder of the galaxy and shows an enhancement of magnesium.

References

External links

Lenticular galaxies
Leo (constellation)
3607
034426